Yakkha (also erroneously spelled as Yakha) is a language spoken in parts of Nepal, Darjeeling district and Sikkim. The Yakkha-speaking villages are located to the East of the Arun river, in the southern part of the Sankhuwasabha district and in the northern part of the Dhankuta district of Nepal. About 14,000 people still speak the language, out of 17,003 ethnic Yakkha in Nepal. Genealogically, Yakkha belongs to the Eastern Kiranti languages and is in one subgroup with several Limbu languages, e.g. Belhare, Athpare, Chintang and Chulung. Ethnically however, the Yakkha people perceive themselves as distinct from the other Kiranti groups such as Limbu.

Geographical distribution
Mugali is spoken between Mugakhola and Sinuwakhola on the eastern banks of the Arun River in Dhankuta District, Province No. 1, Nepal, in the villages (VDC's) of Muga, Pakhribas, and Phalate.

Phangduwali is spoken above the Mugakhola headwaters in Pakhribas VDC, Dhankuta District, Province No. 1, Nepal.

Lumba-Yakkha is spoken in Arkhaule Jitpur and Marek Katahare VDC's, northern Dhankuta District, Province No. 1, Nepal.

Phonology

Vowels
Yakkha has the five vowels . There are no centralized vowels as in other Kiranti languages. Variation between short and long vowels is possible, but this is not a phonemic contrast, because no minimal pairs can be found. Diphthongs such as  can be found in some words such as uimalaŋ "steep descent", or the interjection hoiʔ "Enough!".

Consonants
The consonants are shown in the table below. The voiced consonants in brackets have doubtful status. They are not phonemes, because no minimal pairs can be established. But they are also not motivated by a phonological rule. Furthermore, the voiced consonants occur only in a few words, and some of them are Nepali loans. Examples with initial voiced consonants are gogoba (an insect/worm), gʱak "all", jeppa "really", ɖaŋgak "stick".

Notes:
A typical feature of Eastern Kiranti languages is the merger of voiced and voiceless obstruents, and also Yakkha exhibits this feature. Voicing occurs however optionally between vowels and after nasals. Unaspirated obstruents undergo this voicing rule more regularly than aspirated obstruents. Voiced consonants that are not motivated by  a phonological rule exist, but they are rare.
Another feature of the Yakkha sound system is the change of proto */r/ and */R/ to /y/, e.g. the word for salt is yum in Yakkha, but rum in Puma (Central Kiranti), and rɨm in Dumi (Western Kiranti).
The rhotic [r] is not found word-initially, but in [Cr] clusters and in intervocalic position, as in makhruna "black" and tarokma "start".
Several morphophonological processes operate in Yakkha, so that the underlying forms are not easy to establish. Many of these  processes have to do with substitution by a nasal, e.g. in compound verbs like suncama "itch", the underlying verb stems are /sut/ and /ca/. To take an example from inflection, the verb sapthakma "like" is inflected sapthaŋmecuna "they (dual) like him". Other examples of morphophonological processes are the change of underlying et-se to [esse] (meaning "in order to hunt fish").
Underspecified Nasal prefixes assimilate in the place of articulation to the stem-initial consonant, e.g. m-baŋ "your-house", but n-chem "your-song".
"aka"my

Morphology
Yakkha has rich nominal and verbal morphology. Nouns inflect for case and number. Verbs inflect for person, number (singular, dual, plural/nonsingular), negation, several categories in the domain of tense, aspect and mood. In transitive verbs, both actor and undergoer are coreferenced on the verb. The category of inclusive/exclusive is found in the verbal morphology and in the possessive pronouns and prefixes.

Pronouns
Yakkha pronouns distinguish between singular, dual and plural number, and the possessive pronouns additionally distinguish between the inclusion and the exclusion of the addressee. The third person only has singular and nonsingular forms. The possessive pronouns have developed from the personal pronouns and the genitive marker -ka. The possessive prefixes obviously are grammaticalised possessive pronouns. They can be used instead of the possessive pronouns, e.g. one could say akka paŋ or a-paŋ, both meaning "my house". Sounds represented by /N/ in the table are underspecified nasals.

Plural marking 
Yakkha marks non-singular on common nouns with the suffixing clitic =ci. There is no overt marking of singular.

Interrogatives and indefinite reference
Yakkha has the following interrogative pronouns and other interrogatives: isa "who", i/ina "what", iya "what" (if many items or uncountables are asked for), hetna "which", imin "how", ijaŋ "why", hetne "where", hetniŋ "when". 
If a certain item is asked for, ina will be used, but if an event is in question, the root i occurs without further morphology, e.g. i leksa? "What happened?". Reduplication of the pronouns may result in indefinite reference, e.g.  hetniŋ hetniŋ "some time".

Case system
Yakkha distinguishes the unmarked absolutive case, the ergative -ŋa, the genitive -ka/-ga, the locative -pe/-be, the ablative case -bhaŋ and the comitative case -nuŋ, and the instrumental case -ŋa.

 The absolutive marks subjects of intransitive verbs and objects of transitive verbs. In some verb classes (in the sense of valency classes), objects are marked with a locative or an instrumental. The ergative marks the agents of transitive verbs except for first and second person pronouns, which are in the unmarked nominative. Examples for absolutive and ergative case (overt arguments are often omitted in natural discourse, but the examples contain them to illustrate the case):

 As in many other Kiranti languages, there is an ergative-instrumental syncretism, as both cases are marked by -ŋa. The instrumental is used to mark instruments in a broad sense, and also for temporal reference:

 The genitive, marked by -ka/-ga marks the possessed item in possessive constructions, and materials:

 The locative marks locations and goals of movement and transfer:

 The comitative marks the accompaniment by someone or something. Also adverbials and adverbial clauses can be built with the comitative.

Verbal morphology
The verbal morphology is very complex, which is a typical feature of Kiranti languages. The outline given here necessarily provides a simplified picture. The verbal morphology is predominantly represented by suffixes, but one prefix slot exists, that is filled with an underspecified nasal that codes either third person plural or negation.
Person and number of both actor and undergoer are indicated on the verb, and these affixes may differ according to the semantic role of their referent. For instance, the suffix -ka/-ga codes second person ("you"), regardless of the semantic role, while the suffix -m codes only (first and second person) agents, and the suffix -u only codes third person undergoer. There are syncretisms, for instance the already mentioned suffix -m, that stands for both agreement with first and second person plural (agent). Some relations are coded by a portmanteau morpheme, e.g. the first person acting on the second is coded by '-nen' (i.e. "I understand/call/kiss etc. YOU"), supplemented by number suffixes if necessary. 
Another feature typical for Kiranti verbal morphology is the copying of nasals into syllable codas in the suffix string of a finite verb. For instance, the negated form of tum-me-ŋ-c-u-ŋ-ci-ŋa "we (dual, excl) understand them" is n-dum-me-n-c-u-n-ci-ŋa-n-na, where the negation marker -n is copied several times.
As for tense, the nonpast is overtly marked by -meʔ or -wa. Both suffixes have their origin in grammaticalized lexical verbs ("do" and "be/exist" respectively). They occupy different slots in the verbal suffix template. The past is marked by the suffix -a, which is often elided to avoid hiatus in underlying vowel sequences. The perfect tense is built by the addition of the suffixes -ma or -uks to the past morpheme, and the past perfect tense is built by further addition of the suffix -sa to this suffix string.
As for mood, the imperative is also coded by the suffix -a, e.g. ab-a "Come!" In transitive verbs with a third person patient, the overt suffix is -u, and the imperative suffix is not overtly realised. The subjunctive mood has no dedicated marker, it is marked precisely by the absence of anything but the agreement morphology, e.g. ciya hops-u-m? "Shall we have tea?" (tea sip-3P-1A). The subjunctive mood also expresses warnings, suggestions and potential situations in some subordinate clause types.

References

Bibliography
Driem, George van (1990), The fall and rise of the phoneme /r/ in Eastern Kiranti: sound change in Tibeto-Burman. Bulletin of the School of Oriental and African Studies 53, 83 – 86.
Driem, George van (1994): The Yakkha verb: interpretation and analysis of the Omruwa material (a Kiranti language of Eastern Nepal). Bulletin of the School of Oriental and African Studies 57, 347 – 355.
Driem, George van (2004): Newaric and Mahakiranti. In: Saxena, Anju: Himalayan Languages – past and present. Mouton de Gruyter, Berlin.
Grierson, George A. (1909): Tibeto-Burman family, Part I, General Introduction, specimens of the Tibetan dialects, the Himalayan dialects and the North Assam group., Vol. III of Linguistic Survey of India, Superintendent of Government Printing, India, Calcutta.
Kongren, Ramji (2007a): Yakkha Jatiko Samskar ra Samskriti (Yakkha Indigenous People’s Tradition and Culture). Kirat Yakkha Chumma (Indigenous Peoples Yakkha Organization), Kathmandu.
Kongren, Ramji (2007b): Yakkha–Nepali–English Dictionary. Kirant Yakkha Chumma (Indigenous Peoples Yakkha Organization), Kathmandu.
 
  - published and revised from 2014 thesis
Winter, Werner, Gerd Hansson, Alfons Weidert and Bikram Ingwaba Subba (1996): A Synoptic Glossary of Athpare, Belhare and Yakkha. Lincom Europa, München.

External links 
ELAR archive of Documentation and grammatical description of Yakkha, Nepal

Kiranti languages
Languages of Nepal
Languages of Sikkim
Languages of Koshi Province